JEA is a municipal utility service in Jacksonville, Florida

JEA or Jea may also refer to:
 Jersey European Airways, defunct British airline
JeA (born 1981), a South Korean singer
 Jea, one half of Japanese electronic music collective DJ Sharpnel
 Japan Electric Association
 Japan Evangelical Association
Jordanian Engineers Association
John Emil Augustine
 Journal of Egyptian Archaeology, a scholarly journal on Egyptology
 Journalism Education Association, a national organization for teachers and advisers of journalism.
 Jerusalem Embassy Act of 1995, a public law of the United States initiating the relocation of its embassy in Israel from Tel Aviv to Jerusalem

People with the surname Jea
John Jea (born 1773), American slave and autobiographer